Om Namah Shivaya or Om Namah Shivay is a mantra in Hinduism. It may also refer to:

 Om Namah Shivay (1997 TV series), a 1997 Indian television series
 Om Namah Shivay (2018 TV series), a 2018 Indian Bengali television series
 Om Namah Shivay (album), a 1999 album by Nina Hagen